= Turn On, Tune In, Drop Out! =

2023 album by Mark Alban Lotz

Studio album by Mark Alban Lotz
- Released: June 23, 2023
- Recorded: 26 and 27 May 2022
- Studios: Power Sound Studio Amsterdam, The Netherlands
- Genre: Jazz
- Length: 38:28
- Label: ZenneZ Records
- Producers: Mark Alban Lotz and Mix & Master

Mark Alban Lotz chronology
Freshta (2023)	Turn On, Tune In, Drop Out! (2023)

Turn On, Tune In, Drop Out! is a 2023 jazz album by German flutist and musician Mark Alban Lotz, featuring drummer Jamie Peet and bassist Zack Lober. Lotz collaborated with bassist Zack Lober and drummer Jamie Peet to create music inspired by Timothy Leary's "eight circuit model of consciousness," a psychedelic concept.

== Reviews ==
Writing for All About Jazz, Mike Jurkovic described Turn In, Turn On, Drop Out! as infused with "a curious sense of humor", drawing inspiration from "acid folk-hero Timothy Leary's era defining treatise by the same title". Jurkovic further noted that "Lotz [...] has such a ballerina's grace and instinct to his playing that synapses snap, pop, and burble" in a manner reminiscent of a psychedelic experience. Jurkovic also praised drummer Jamie Peet and bassist Zack Lobe for their contributions to the overall psychedelic experience.

Portuguese critic António Branco described Turn In, Turn On, Drop Out! as a "vibrant and energetic album". Branco noted the fresh and urgent quality of the compositions emphasize the synergy between the musicians and their dynamic improvisations. Branco praised the work for its diverse influences and precise compositions, as well as for the trio's ability to create a lively and engaging musical experience.

== Track list ==
1. Push
2. Beat The Drum
3. Dance The Monolith
4. Lust
5. Relax And Flow
6. Bring Delight
7. Consciousness
8. Isabel
9. Up!
10. Trance Out
11. Bonus track : Push (alternate take)
